The Buffum was an American automobile manufactured from 1901 until 1907 by the H.H. Buffum Co. of Abington, Massachusetts. The company also built a line of powered launches.

History
Buffums built between 1901 and 1904 were powered by 4-cylinder engines, but later in 1904 they built the Model G Greyhound, which was a racing model powered by two horizontal four-cylinder engines coupled together to make a flat-eight cylinder engine. The Greyhound was the first 8-cylinder car offered for sale in the United States. In 1906 another eight-cylinder powered car was offered for sale, although this time the engine was a V8.

Models

External links

References

Defunct motor vehicle manufacturers of the United States
Abington, Massachusetts
Motor vehicle manufacturers based in Massachusetts